A Plague Tale: Requiem is an action-adventure stealth game developed by Asobo Studio and published by Focus Entertainment. It is the sequel to A Plague Tale: Innocence (2019), and follows siblings Amicia and Hugo de Rune who must look for a cure to Hugo's blood disease in Southern France while fleeing from soldiers of the Inquisition and hordes of rats that are spreading the black plague. The game was released for Nintendo Switch, PlayStation 5, Windows, and Xbox Series X/S on 18 October 2022, with the Nintendo Switch version being a cloud-based title.

Gameplay
Requiem is an action-adventure game played from a third-person perspective. In the game, the player assumes control of Amicia and must face off against both soldiers from the French Inquisition and hordes of rats that are spreading the black plague. Gameplay is largely similar to the first game, though the combat system is significantly expanded. Amicia is equipped with weapons such as a knife to stab enemies, a sling that can be used to throw rocks, and a crossbow which allows her to easily defeat armoured opponents. Crossbow bolts, throwing pots, and rocks can be combined with alchemical mixtures. In addition to Ignifer and Extinguis, which allows the player to light and extinguish flame respectively, the game introduces tar, which increases the radius of the light source, and can be used to ignite enemies.

Locations are also larger in Requiem, giving players additional options to progress. Stealth is expanded in Requiem. Unlike Innocence, Amicia would not die after being hit once by enemies. She can also return to stealth after she was discovered by enemies, and counter their attacks if she gets too close to them. Amicia's brother Hugo, who has a connection to the plague, can use an ability named "Echo" which reveals the locations of enemies through walls. Hugo can also control the hordes of rats to overwhelm enemies. Similar to the first game, the rats, which are light-averse, play a huge role in the game. Amicia and Hugo must stay in the light, or they will be devoured by the rats. Amicia can use the rats to her advantage, manipulating them to solve puzzles, or even lure them to kill enemies.

The game also features a progression system in which the player will be awarded additional skills and abilities. Stealth players will unlock skills that allows them to sneak around more efficiently, while those who prefer a more lethal approach will unlock additional combat skills. The player's gear and equipment can also be upgraded at workbenches.

Plot
Six months following the events of the first game, siblings Amicia (Charlotte McBurney) and Hugo de Rune (Logan Hannan), along with their mother Beatrice (Lucy Briggs-Owen) and her apprentice Lucas (Kit Connor), seek refuge among an organization of alchemists called the Order. A hostile group of beekeepers attacks the siblings, causing the Prima Macula to reawaken in Hugo. In a town in Provence, Beatrice and Order representative Vaudin's (Antony Byrne) attempts to treat Hugo only exacerbate his condition, resulting in the town being swarmed by rats and left in ruins. Vaudin is killed while the others escape on a boat bound for the Order's headquarters in Marseille.

Unwilling to see Hugo locked up as the Order’s test subject, Amicia takes Hugo and leaves Beatrice and Lucas to seek an island of which Hugo has recurring dreams, hoping it will lead to a cure for the Macula. Along the way, they are pursued by Provence soldiers, as well as mercenaries led by the disgraced knight Arnaud (Harry Myers). Arnaud offers to arrange transport to the island from Hugo's dreams, La Cuna. They sail to the island on the ship of Arnaud's smuggler friend Sophia (Anna Demetriou).

Arriving at La Cuna, the group discovers that the residents, led by Count Victor (Alistair Petrie) and Countess Emilie (Ellie Heydon), worship a pagan deity called the Child of Embers. Arnaud tries to coerce Hugo into summoning rats to attack Victor — whom he blames for the death of his son — but Amicia intervenes, and Arnaud is arrested. Amicia deduces that the Count and Countess are unknowingly worshipping a previous Macula carrier as the Child. With Sophia, they delve into an ancient Order temple, following the history of the carrier, Basilius, and his protector, Aelia. Entering a chapel where Aelia was imprisoned after rebelling against the Order, the group encounters a cult of slavers who offer human sacrifices to the Child; Hugo summons rats to kill the slavers. The group discovers Basilius was imprisoned underground by the Order to contain the Macula, and Aelia died before she could reach him. Without Aelia, Basilius gave in to the Macula and unleashed the Justinian Plague. Amicia realizes the Macula showed Hugo the dream to lure him into its clutches, and they flee the prison as it collapses under a horde of rats.

Amicia and Hugo return to Victor's castle and reunite with Beatrice and Lucas. Amicia reasons that, if they are there to support Hugo, the Macula will remain dormant. However, Victor reveals Emilie believes Hugo is the Child — a myth Victor invented for Emilie, who is infertile — so they must kill Hugo's old family and adopt him. After Emilie kills Beatrice in a ritual sacrifice, Hugo summons a horde of rats which devours Emilie and destroys much of the island. Amicia's group rescues Arnaud before escaping on Sophia's ship, with Victor in pursuit. Victor wounds Amicia and captures Hugo while the rest are forced overboard. On shore, Arnaud sacrifices himself to allow Amicia to kill Victor, but they are too late to prevent Hugo, who believes Amicia to be dead, from giving himself over to the Macula. A cloud blots out the sun, allowing the rats to spread unchecked and destroy Marseille. Amicia delves into the ruined city, where Hugo's voice tells her that, having now fully merged with the Macula, the only way to stop the rats is to kill him. Hugo will be killed by Lucas if Amicia refuses to do so.

One year later, Amicia has a home in the mountains, and Lucas is continuing his alchemy studies. Amicia prepares to journey with Sophia to find the next Macula carrier and protector so that she can help guide them. Before she leaves, she pays her respects to Hugo's grave.

In a post-credits scene set in the modern era, a child is on a ventilator, with signs of the Macula on the skin.

Development
Requiem was developed by French video game development company Asobo Studio. Similar to the first game, the game is set in Medieval France in the 14th century. To ensure the authenticity of the locations, the team collaborated with Roxane Chila, a doctor in Medieval History, and browsed both Wikipedia and other specialized websites for additional information. They also drew inspirations from the personal experiences of some of their team members. The team decided early on that the game would have a different colour palette when compared with its predecessor. As a result, the setting of the game was moved from the gloomy, war-torn Aquitaine to Provence, which is more colorful and vibrant. According to lead writer Sébastien Renard, this created a "sharper contrast between the harsh reality of the medieval setting, in which terrible events are happening, and beautiful, sometimes uncharted environments". To create additional opportunities for puzzle-solving, the game introduces several new locations including harbours and marketplaces, in Requiem.

A Plague Tale: Requiem was announced by Asobo Studio and publisher Focus Entertainment during Microsoft's E3 2021 press conference. The game competed for the Tribeca Games Award and was included as an official selection. The game was released on 18 October 2022 for PlayStation 5, Windows, and Xbox Series X/S. The release of a new generation of consoles allowed the game to render more than 300,000 rats at once. A cloud-only version was also to be released for Nintendo Switch on the same day.

Reception

A Plague Tale: Requiem received  "generally favorable reviews" from critics, according to review aggregator Metacritic.

It was the fifth best-selling video game in the United Kingdom in its week of release. On 4 November 2022, Focus Entertainment announced that the game had sold more than 1 million copies.

Accolades

References

External links
 

2022 video games
Action-adventure games
Asobo Studio games
Cloud-based Nintendo Switch games
Focus Entertainment games
Inquisition in fiction
Nintendo Switch games
PlayStation 5 games
Single-player video games
Stealth video games
Video game sequels
Video games about mice and rats
Video games about siblings
Video games about viral outbreaks
Video games developed in France
Video games featuring female protagonists
Video games scored by Olivier Deriviere
Video games set in the Middle Ages
Video games set in the 14th century
Video games set in France
Windows games
Xbox Series X and Series S games